In psychology and sociology, masking is the process in which an individual camouflages their natural personality or behavior to conform to social pressures, abuse or harassment. Masking can be strongly influenced by environmental factors such as authoritarian parents, rejection, and emotional, physical, or sexual abuse. Masking can be a behavior individuals adopt subconsciously as coping mechanisms or a trauma response, or it can be a conscious behavior an individual adopts to fit in within perceived societal norms. Masking is interconnected with maintaining performative behavior within social structures and cultures.

Autistic masking refers to the suppression of autistic or neurodivergent traits to pass within society, and is a major focus of neurodiversity research.

History 

Masking has existed since antiquity, with authors like Shakespeare referencing it in fiction long before masking was formally defined and studied within psychology. Frantz Fanon is credited with defining masking in his 1957 Black Skin, White Masks, which describes masking behavior in race relations within the stratified post-war United States. Fanon explains how African-Americans, especially those of low social capital, adopted certain behaviors to resemble white people as well as other behaviors intended to please whites and reinforce the white man's higher social status.

The term masking was used to describe the act of concealing disgust by Paul Ekman (1972) and Friesen (1969). It was also thought of as a learned behavior. Developmental studies have shown that this ability begins as early as preschool and improves with age. Masking is mostly used to conceal a negative emotion (usually sadness, frustration, and anger) with a positive emotion or indifferent affect.

Causes 

The social drivers of masking include social discrimination, cultural dominance, and violence. Elizabeth Radulski argues that masking is a cultural performance within Judith Butler's concept of performativity that helps individuals bypass cultural and structural barriers.

Situational contexts 
The causes of masking are highly contextual and situational. Masking may disguise emotions considered socially inappropriate within a situational context, such as anger, jealousy or rage. Individuals may mask in certain social situations, such as job interviews or dates, or around people of different cultures, identities, or ethnicities. Since different social situations require different performances, individuals often switch masks and exhibit different masking behaviors in different contexts. Code-switching, although associated more with linguistics, also refers to the process of changing one's masking behavior around different cultures in social and cultural anthropology. Contextual factors including relationships with one's conversation partner, social capital (class) differences, location, and social setting are all reasons why an individual would express, suppress, or mask an emotion.

There is a gendered disparity in masking behavior; studies show women mask negative emotions to a greater extent than men. According to psychologist Teresa Davis, this may be due to the greater social expectation for conformity placed on female gender roles, causing women to develop the skill to a greater extent than men during childhood socialization.

Autistic masking 
Some autistic people have been described as being able to "mask" or "camouflage" their signs of autism in order to meet social expectations. This may involve suppressing self-calming repetitive movements, faking a smile in an environment that they find uncomfortable or distressing, consciously evaluating their own behavior and mirroring others, or choosing not to talk about their special interests. Autistic people with conversational difficulties may also use more complex strategies such as scripting a conversation outline and developing conscious 'rules' for conversations, and carefully monitoring if these are being followed. Autistic people often learn conversational rules, social behaviors, and masking techniques by watching television shows and other media, often learning how to mimic a character's behavior. As masking is often a conscious effort, it can be exhausting for autistic people to mask for an extended period of time. Autistic people have cited social acceptance, the need to get a job, avoiding ostracism, or avoiding verbal or physical abuse as reasons for masking. 

Autistic women mask to a greater extent and complexity than autistic men and are often underdiagnosed as a result. 

Masking may conceal the person's need for support. Research has found that autistic masking is correlated with depression and suicide. Many autistic adults in one survey described profound exhaustion from trying to pretend to be non-autistic. Masking for extended periods of time can result in burnout and emotional trauma. Therapies that teach autistic people to mask, such as some forms of applied behavior analysis, are controversial.

Consequences 
Little is known about the effects of masking one's negative emotions. In the workplace, masking leads to feelings of dissonance, insincerity, job dissatisfaction, emotional and physical exhaustion, and self-reported health problems. Some have also reported experiencing somatic symptoms and harmful physiological and cognitive effects as a consequence.

See also 

 Alter ego
 Beard (companion)
 Closet Jew
 Closeted
 Defense mechanism
 Dramaturgy (sociology)
 Facial Action Coding System
 Identity formation
 Minority stress
 Model minority
 Passing (sociology)
 Persona (psychology)
 Shibboleth
 Stigma management
 Undercover

References 

 
 
+ 
 
 
 

Personality